Diomus notescens, common name the minute two-spotted ladybird is a ladybird species endemic to the east and south of Australia.

Description
This small beetle is only 2.5 millimetres long. It is a deep shade of greenish-black with two large reddish-brown patches on the elytra. It is covered with very short pubescence.

References

External links
 Minute Two Spotted Ladybird gallery and information at www.brisbaneinsects.com

Coccinellidae
Beetles of Australia
Beetles described in 1889
Taxa named by Thomas Blackburn (entomologist)